The Thomson executive council was the 21st and last executive council of British Ceylon. The government was led by Governor Graeme Thomson. The Executive Council of Ceylon was replaced by the Board of Ministers of Ceylon in July 1931.

Executive council members

See also
 Cabinet of Sri Lanka

References

1931 establishments in Ceylon
1931 disestablishments in Ceylon
Cabinets established in 1931
Cabinets disestablished in 1931
Ceylonese executive councils
Ministries of George V